Code#01 Bad Girl is the debut extended play by South Korean girl group Ladies' Code. It was released on March 7, 2013 through Polaris Entertainment and CJ E&M Music. Its lead single "Bad Girl" was released the same day.

Track listing

Charts

Sales and certifications

Release history

References

External links 
 
 

2013 EPs
Korean-language EPs
Ladies' Code albums